Svenska Supercupen 2008, Swedish Super Cup 2008, was a Swedish football match, played 22 March 2008 between Allsvenskan champions IFK Göteborg and Svenska Cupen winners Kalmar FF. The match was played at Ullevi in Gothenburg.

Jonas Wallerstedt gave IFK the lead in halftime in the 24th minute. Later, in the 67th minute, Hjálmar Jónsson scored on a freekick from distance and Wallerstedt got his second of the afternoon in the 82nd minute. César Santin got one back for Kalmar in the 87th minute.

This was the 2nd edition of Svenska Supercupen, the first was in 2007 when IF Elfsborg beat Helsingborgs IF 1-0.

Match facts

Supercupen
Supercupen seasons
Svenska Supercupen 2008
Svenska Supercupen 2008
2000s in Gothenburg
Sports competitions in Gothenburg